My Melody is the fifth studio album by American singer Deniece Williams, released in March 1981 by ARC/Columbia Records. The album reached No. 13 on the Billboard Top Soul Albums chart. My Melody has been certified Gold in the US by the RIAA.

Overview
"Silly" and "What Two Can Do" which peaked at number 11 and 17 on the Billboard Black Singles charts.

Track listing

Charts

Weekly charts

Year-end charts

Personnel

Musicians
 Bob Babbitt – bass
 Thom Bell – keyboards, backing vocals, arrangements, conductor
 Charles Collins – drums
 Bobby Eli – guitar
 Carl Helm – backing vocals
 George Merrill – keyboards, backing vocals
 Bill Neale – guitar
 Don Renaldo – strings, horns
 Ed Shea – percussion
 Larry Washington – percussion
 Deniece Williams – lead vocals

Production
 Producers – Thom Bell and Deniece Williams 
 Production Coordination – JoDee Omar and Bo Ryan
 Rhythm Tracks and Vocals engineered by Jim Gallagher and Don Murray.
 Strings and Horns engineered by Jim Gallagher and Arthur Stoppe.
 Mixed by Don Murray at Monterey Sound Studios (Glendale, CA).
 Mastered by Mike Reese at The Mastering Lab (Los Angeles, CA).
 Art Direction – Desmond Strobel
 Photography – Charles William Bush

References

Deniece Williams albums
1981 albums
Columbia Records albums
ARC Records albums
Albums produced by Thom Bell
Albums recorded at Sigma Sound Studios